Boscoppa is a settlement in the amalgamation of St Austell in Cornwall, England, United Kingdom. Originally Boscoppa was a separate village but is now a suburb of St Austell (Cornwall's largest town) and is west of the recently built A391 bypass road. The village lies in a former mining area.

References

External links

Villages in Cornwall
St Austell